Efemena Tennyson Abogidi (born October 11, 2001) is a Nigerian professional basketball player for the NBA G League Ignite of the NBA G League. He played college basketball for the Washington State Cougars of the Pac-12 Conference.

Early life and career
Abogidi grew up in Ughelli, a town in Delta State, Nigeria. He competed in track and field, including sprinting, long jump and high jump. Abogidi watched highlight videos of Tim Duncan, who he tried to emulate in local pick-up basketball games. In 2015 and 2016, he was named most valuable player of a camp run by Olumide Oyedeji in Lagos. Abogidi joined Hoops & Read, a program created by Oyedeji's foundation, and helped his team earn a promotion into the Nigerian Premier League in 2016. In the next year, he moved to Senegal to attend the NBA Academy Africa in its first year. In June 2017, at the NBA Academy Games in Canberra, Australia, he suffered a torn ACL, MCL and meniscus while attempting a slam dunk. He underwent surgery and began attending the NBA Global Academy in Canberra. He committed to playing college basketball for Washington State over offers from Creighton and UT Arlington.

College career
In December 2020, Abogidi recorded three consecutive double-doubles and was named Pac-12 Freshman of the Week. He averaged 8.9 points, 7.2 rebounds and 1.3 blocks per game as a freshman, earning Pac-12 All-Freshman Team honors.

Career statistics

College

|-
| style="text-align:left;"| 2020–21
| style="text-align:left;"| Washington State
| 27 || 27 || 24.4 || .491 || .273 || .811 || 7.2 || .4 || .7 || 1.3 || 8.9

References

External links
Washington State Cougars bio

2001 births
Living people
NBA G League Ignite players
Nigerian men's basketball players
Nigerian expatriate basketball people in the United States
Washington State Cougars men's basketball players
Centers (basketball)
Sportspeople from Delta State